Charles Stuart, 6th Earl of Moray, 1st Baronet  (before 1683 – 7 October 1735), also spelled Charles Stewart, was the son of Alexander Stuart, 5th Earl of Moray and his wife, Emilia Balfour.  He acceded to his father's titles in 1701 and died in 1735.  He was succeeded by his brother, Francis.

He married Lady Anne Campbell, daughter of Archibald Campbell, 9th Earl of Argyll and Lady Mary Stuart, after 1695. He died on 7 October 1735, without legitimate male issue, only one daughter.

He was created 1st Baronet Stuart [Nova Scotia] on 23 September 1681. He succeeded as the 6th Lord Strathdearn [S., 1563] on 1 November 1700. He succeeded as the 6th Earl of Moray [S., 1562] on 1 November 1700. He succeeded as the 6th Lord Abernethy [S., 1562] on 1 November 1700. He succeeded as the 6th Lord Doune [S., 1581] on 1 November 1700. He succeeded as the 4th Lord Saint Colme [S., 1620] on 1 November 1700. From 1707 to 1708 he was imprisoned as a suspected Jacobite. He was appointed Knight, Order of the Thistle (K.T.) in 1731. On his death his baronetcy became extinct.

Notes

References
Geology Gordon Book
Stewart Clan Magazine, Volumes 1-10; G.T. Edson, 1922—St. Paul's Parish Register: Stafford-King George Counties, Virginia, 1715–1798; Genealogical Publishing 2009
St. Paul 
Church History
Will 

Earls of Moray

17th-century births
1735 deaths

Year of birth unknown